Paul Hetherington (born 6 March 1958) is an Australian poet and academic, who also worked for 19 years at the National Library of Australia. He is Professor of Writing at the University of Canberra where he heads the university's International Poetry Studies Institute (IPSI) which he co-founded. He is an editor of the international journal Axon: Creative Explorations and co-founder of the International Prose Poetry Project.

Biography
Paul Hetherington's parents are Robert Hetherington (1923–2015) and Penelope Hetherington (née Loveday) (1928–). He grew up in Adelaide with his twin brother Mark and his younger sister Naomi (1961–) until his family moved to Perth in 1966 when his father accepted a job in the fledgling Politics Department of the University of Western Australia. His father later became a Western Australian member of parliament. His mother was an academic historian with particular interests in African History and Women's History, who worked at the University of Western Australia.

Hetherington undertook his undergraduate studies at the University of Western Australia, achieving a double major in English and History and at the end of his honours year in 1984 was awarded three undergraduate prizes. He completed a doctoral thesis at the same university in 1989 on the topic '"The Representative of the Verse": Death, Crisis and Versions of the Self in the Poetry of Emily Dickinson'. In his twenties he performed, wrote and directed for different amateur theatre groups. He lived as Michelle Frances Combs' partner from 1980 and they married in 1985. Their daughters are Suzannah and Rebecca.

Hetherington worked as a sessional tutor while undertaking postgraduate studies and then accepted the job of Publications and Events Coordinator at Fremantle Arts Centre in 1989. In 1990 he moved to the National Library as Education Manager and editor of National Library News (1990 to 2009). In 1994 he became director of the Library's Publications Branch and from 1999 to 2009 directed the Publications and Events Branch, where his responsibilities included book publishing, website development and a program of conferences. After leaving the National Library of Australia he became Assistant Professor of Writing in the Faculty of Arts and Design at the University of Canberra in 2010 and is now Professor of Writing there. He is head of the International Poetry Studies Institute (IPSI) which was co-founded with Jen Webb and post-doctoral fellow Paul Munden.  He is a co-founder of the International Prose Poetry Project, which he says, 'I started that, really by accident, by sending a prose poem to a couple of colleagues of mine at the University of Canberra'.

He has played a significant role in the ACT cultural community, serving on numerous boards and helping to found the ACT Writers Centre in the mid-1990s and chairing its inaugural committee of management. He also chaired the ACT Cultural Council (2005–13) and the ACT Public Art Panel (2006–11). He is a former Deputy Chair of the ACT's Word Festival. He was a board member for the arts magazine Muse. Nationally he was a member of the Board of Australian Book Review (2004–12).

Poetry career
Hetherington's career as a writer spans more than 30 years, and he has published 12 full-length poetry collections and six poetry chapbooks, along with numerous academic articles.  He has spoken of deciding to write poetry at the age of 11 and has commented that 'One of the ways I recognise the poetic is when I find works in which language is condensed, ramifying, polysemous and unparaphraseable.'

After achieving journal and magazine publication of his poems throughout the 1980s, the National Library of Australia published Hetherington's poetry chapbook, Mapping Wildwood Road in 1990 and Fremantle Arts Centre Press published Acts Themselves Trivial, his first full-length poetry collection in 1991. Molonglo Press in the ACT published his next four poetry books, including Shadow Swimmer, which won the 1996 ACT Book of the Year Award. Pandanus Books at the ANU then released his verse novel Blood and Old Belief in 2003. It Feels Like Disbelief was published in 2007 by Salt Publishing (Cambridge, UK). Three recent volumes, Six Different Windows (2013) – which won the 2014 Western Australian Premier's Book Awards (poetry) – and Burnt Umber (2016) - shortlisted for the Kenneth Slessor Prize for Poetry - and Moonlight on Oleander: Prose Poems (2018) have been released by UWA Publishing. Hetherington has said that Burnt Umber marked something of a new departure for him 'in a couple of ways … One of them is the presence of prose poetry in the collection … The other thing that's different is the ekphrastic poetry in the book.' Moonlight on Oleander extends Hetherington's interest in the prose poem form and is one of relatively few books consisting solely of prose poetry to have been published in Australia in the last decade. In 2002 Hetherington was awarded a Chief Minister's ACT Creative Arts Fellowship and in 2012 was awarded one of two places on the Australian Poetry Tour to Ireland, accompanied by Melbourne poet Petra White. In 2014 he was awarded an Australia Council for the Arts Literature Section Residency in the BR Whiting Studio in Rome for a practice-led research project entitled 'Roman Paintings' and while in Rome read at the Keats-Shelley House. In 2017 he won the Individual Research Excellence Award, Humanities and Creative Arts at the University of Canberra.

Critical response to Hetherington's poetry
In reviewing Hetherington's Acts Themselves Trivial (1991), Simon Patton writes that 'the insight is certainly compelling. The desire to remember is established in these poems as a vital aspect of our humanity'. Shirley Walker writes of Shadow Swimmer (1995) that 'This is poetry of glowing sensuality, of urgent narrative pace, of tact in its exploration of intimate experience.' Glenda Guest remarks of the verse novel, Blood and Old Belief (2003) that 'Hetherington's writing is immaculate; he finds the hidden nuances at the core of each person', while Paul Kane characterises Hetherington's style in It Feels Like Disbelief (2007) as 'similarly lucid in voice, diction and image. This felicitous combination gives his poems the feel of poise, intelligence, grace and finish.' Peter Pierce comments that Six Different Windows (2013) is 'one [of] the finest collections of poetry this year' and Mags Webster writes that Burnt Umber (2016) 'is a fine example of language – and poetry – "doing itself right"': 'If paintings can be "read" like text, then Hetherington's fusion of word and  image bring to mind Howard Nemerov's suggestion that "both poet and painter want to reach the silence behind the language, the silence within the language". Hetherington's poems are tender, sometimes playful, sometimes self-deprecating, and in the case of 'Painting 22: Portrait of a Count', which appears in tribute to the poet's father, achingly poignant'.

As editor
Paul Hetherington was co-editor in 1983 with Victor Bivoltsis and Andrew Masterson of a short-lived literary journal Perverse Pleasures. He became Associate Editor of Fremantle Arts Reviewin 1989 and editor of the magazine later that year. He was founding editor of Voices: the Quarterly Journal of the National Library of Australia from 1991 to 1997 and Editor of National Library of Australia News from 1990 to 2009. He was Poetry Editor of the Canberra Times from 1998 to 2000.

From 2003 to 2006 Hetherington edited the final three volumes of the National Library of Australia's four-volume edition of the diaries of the Australian artist Donald Friend. Volume four of the published diaries covers Friend’s time in Bali and contains explicit accounts of sexual relations with children, several of whom are named. Hetherington has been reported as saying: "I don’t think Friend behaved in a way that would attract much criticism from people today, which at the time didn’t attract particular criticism either." Hetherington says his comment was taken out of context: "I was referring to a range of his books but not the diaries [that] were edited and published … they are a rare documentary resource about the mid-20th century here and overseas, this does not mean that those involved in editing and publishing the diaries endorse all of Friend’s activities." and, to the ABC: "I don't know that we can today go into the complexity of the relationships between Friend and the young men and women who worked as houseboys — essentially that's how he saw them — in the 1960s and 1970s in Bali. Friend's activities and attitudes … throughout his life, and still to this day, [have] met with a wide range of responses … people are entitled and should make up their own minds about what they think of Friend and these activities and his artistic work." In a review in The Australian, of the diaries Frank Campbell wrote, "Hetherington politely observes, ‘Friend was entirely unsuited to a life of heterosexual monogamy.’ Well, it’s all right Paul, he’s dead, so it’s safe to call Friend a paedophile." Hetherington is recorded as saying on radio,  There are some things in the diaries obviously that some people will find less attractive than others, but in publishing them, we wanted to publish the diaries as they are, more or less, with the sensitivity that I talked about earlier, because we think that it's important that people can read the material for themselves and make their own mind up about them.In 2010 Hetherington was for a time the consultant Managing Editor to establish the National Library of Australia's project to publish in association with Australian Capital Equity, Pierre Bernard Milius: Last commander of the Baudin expedition: the journal 1800–1804. He is co-founding editor of the international online journal Axon: Creative Explorations (2011-) and a founding editorial committee member of the Meniscus journal (2013–). In 2014 he was co-editor with Shane Strange and Jen Webb of the scholarly book Creative Manoeuvres: Writing, Making, Being. In 2016 he was co-editor with Jen Webb of the bilingual Open Windows: Contemporary Australian Poetry – An English-Chinese Anthology (transl Tao Naikan) and in that year he was co-poetry editor with Cassandra Atherton for the poems in a prose poem issue of Rabbit: A Journal for Nonfiction Poetry and a special issue of Cordite Poetry Review on ekphrastic poetry, published in March 2017.

Works

Full-length poetry collections
1991: Acts Themselves Trivial, Fremantle: Fremantle Arts Centre Press

1993: The Dancing Scorpion, Canberra: Molonglo Press

1995: Shadow Swimmer, Canberra: Molonglo Press

1998: Canvas Light, Canberra: Molonglo Press

2001: Stepping Away: Selected Poems, Canberra: Molonglo Press

2007: It Feels Like Disbelief, Cambridge, UK: Salt Publishing

2013: Six Different Windows, Crawley, WA: University of Western Australia Publishing

2015 (with Jen Webb as photographer): Watching the World: Impressions of Canberra, Canberra: Blemish Books

2016: Burnt Umber, Crawley, WA: University of Western Australia Publishing

2016: Gallery of Antique Art, Canberra: Recent Work Press

2017:  Ìkaros. Canberra: Recent Work Press

2018: Moonlight on Oleander, Crawley, WA: UWA Publishing

Poetry chapbooks 
1990: Mapping Wildwood Road, Pamphlet Poets, Series One, No. 4, Canberra: National Library of Australia

2012: Chicken and Other Poems, ed. Judy Johnson, Wagtail 119, Picaro Press (ISSN 1444-8424)

2013 (with Anita Fitton as digital artist): ' 'Spectral resemblances' ', Belconnen, ACT Faculty of Arts and Design, University of Canberra

2015 (with Cassandra Atherton, Paul Munden, Jen Webb, Jordan Williams): Jars IPSI Series: Authorised Theft, Canberra, ACT : International Poetry Studies Institute, Faculty of Arts and Design, University of Canberra 

2016 (with Cassandra Atherton, Paul Munden, Jen Webb, Jordan Williams): The Taoist Elements: Earth IPSI Series: Authorised Theft, Kambah, ACT: Recent Work Press

2017 (with Cassandra Atherton, Paul Munden, Jen Webb, Jordan Williams): Colours: Blue, IPSI Series: Authorised Theft, Kambah, ACT: Recent Work Press

Verse novel
2003: Blood and Old Belief: A Verse Novel, Canberra, ANU: Pandanus Books

As editor
2003: The Diaries of Donald Friend, Volume 2, National Library of Australia, Canberra

2005: The Diaries of Donald Friend, Volume 3, National Library of Australia, Canberra

2006: The Diaries of Donald Friend, Volume 4, National Library of Australia, Canberra

2014: (with Shane Strange and Jen Webb): Creative Manoeuvres: Writing, Making, Being, Newcastle upon Tyne: Cambridge Scholars Publishing

2016: ' 'Chuang kou : dang dai Aodaliya shi ge : Zhong Ying shuang yu xuan ji' ', [Ao] Zhen Weibo (Jen Webb), Baoluo Heselindun (Paul Hetherington) zhu bian ; Tao Naikan yi, Shanghai : Shanghai san lian shu dian

Collaborations
Hetherington has written, published and exhibited collaboratively with various writers, artists and scholars. These are Jordan Williams, Anita Fitton, Jen Webb, Antonia Pont, Judith Crispin, David McCooey, Paul Munden, Rachel Robertson and Cassandra Atherton, among others – and with Phil Day on a series of artist's books in a three-way collaboration that also includes Atherton. The first two of these books are Dilly Dally and Moon.

Awards 
Among the awards Hetherington has received are:
1996: Australian Capital Territory (ACT) Book of the Year
1997: ANUTECH Poetry Prize 
2002: Chief Minister's ACT Creative Arts Fellowship
2012: Australian Poetry Tour to Ireland, the Australian Poetry organisation (one of two positions)
2014: Western Australian Premier's Book Awards (poetry)
2014: Australia Council for the Arts Literature Section Residency in the BR Whiting Studio in Rome
2017: Vice-Chancellor’s Award for Outstanding Achievements in Research or Innovation, University of Canberra (part of the eight-member Creativity and Social Change Team, the Centre for Creative and Cultural Research) (co-winner)
2017: Individual Research Excellence Award, Humanities and Creative Arts, the annual Awards for Research and Innovation Excellence, University of Canberra
2021: Bruce Dawe National Poetry Prize

References

1958 births
Living people
Academic staff of the University of Canberra
Australian poets